Fairwood Common is a large area of barely populated common land in the heart of the Gower Peninsula, south Wales.  It forms part of the Gower Area of Outstanding Natural Beauty.

Swansea Airport is located in the middle of the common. This was developed from the World War II airfield named RAF Fairwood Common.

Fairwood Park Golf Course
The area is also home to Fairwood Park Golf Course, the only 'Championship' status golf course on the Gower Peninsula, having twice hosted the Welsh PGA Championships. The clubhouse was previously a secret RAF Hospital during World War II.

References

External links
CADW Historic Landscape Characterisation: Fairwood Park and Golf Course

Gower Peninsula
Golf clubs and courses in Wales
Sports venues in Swansea
Pennard (community)
Common land in Wales